The Auburn Tigers women's gymnastics team represents Auburn University in the sport of gymnastics. The team competes in Division I of the National Collegiate Athletics Association (NCAA) and the Southeastern Conference (SEC). The Tigers host their home meets at the Auburn Arena on the school's main Auburn campus. The team is currently led by head coach Jeff Graba. In their four decades of history, the Tigers have made four appearances at the National Championships; making the Super Six twice.

History 
Auburn Gymnastics history dates back to the late 1890s but the Auburn Tigers gymnastics program wasn't founded until 1965 by Edwin Bengston; a kinesiology lecturer at the University and weightlifter. After a successful few years of competition, the program was discontinued. In 1974, the program was reinstated by Bengston; Title IX providing the first form of financial aid of $150 to Jeanne Denoon-Amos.

Roster

Head coach: Jeff Graba
Assistant coach: Kurt Hettinger
Assistant coach: Ashley Johnston

Past Olympians 
 Sunisa Lee (2020)

References 

 
1974 establishments in Alabama
Sports clubs established in 1974